The Crusader is a 1932 American pre-Code drama film based upon the play of the same name by Wilson Collison, directed by Frank R. Strayer, and starring Evelyn Brent.

Plot
A pushy newspaper reporter Eddie Crane (Ned Sparks) schemes to get rid of crusading District Attorney Phillip Brandon (H. B. Warner). Complicating matters is the sordid past of Brandon's wife Tess (Evelyn Brent) as well as his sister Marcia's affair with a gangster.

Cast
 Evelyn Brent as Tess Brandon
 H. B. Warner as Phillip Brandon
 Lew Cody as Jimmie Dale
 Ned Sparks as Eddie Crane
 Walter Byron as Joe Carson
 Marceline Day as Marcia Brandon
 John St. Polis as Robert Henley
 Arthur Hoyt as Oscar Shane
 Joseph W. Girard as Corrigan
 Syd Saylor as Harry Smaltz
 Lloyd Ingraham as Alton

References

External links 

1932 films
1932 drama films
American drama films
American black-and-white films
Films directed by Frank R. Strayer
Majestic Pictures films
1930s English-language films
1930s American films